The Lega Basket Serie A (LBA) Best Defender is an annual basketball award of the LBA. It is awarded to the best defensive player throughout the season, up until the Finals stage of the season.

Winners

References